Phymatodes obliquus is a species of beetle in the family Cerambycidae. It is endemic to Santa Clara, California.

References

obliquus
Beetles described in 1891
Endemic fauna of California
Fauna without expected TNC conservation status